Stann Champion (born May 16, 1952) is an American-born guitarist, singer, songwriter, and producer. He plays guitar and drums blending reggae, calypso, R&B, and rock music styles. Best known as the leader of the band "Roots, Rock Society" (RRS), Champion provides music therapy at hospitals and nursing homes.  He has appeared with Blue Oyster Cult, Quiet Riot, Gil Scott-Heron, Steel Pulse, Third World, Culture, and Burning Spear.  He has received 12 Chicago Music Awards (CMA), for "Best Calypso," "Best Soul Calypso," and "Best Gospel/Spiritual Band," as well as CMA's "Lifetime Achievement Award," for his contributions to the Chicago music industry and community involvement.

Early life and education
Champion was born in Pittsburgh, Pennsylvania, United States, and moved to Chicago, Illinois at an early age, where he was enrolled in public K-12 schools and the Chicago Art Institute Junior School. He attended Southern Illinois University at Edwardsville (SIUE), and Columbia College Chicago where, in 1974, he received his Bachelor of Arts in Graphic Design.

Career
Before graduating from Chicago's Columbia College, Champion went to work at a couple of Michigan Avenue advertising agencies during the day and played music at night. He was approached by a songwriter from the island of St. Kitts to record at Bob Marley's Tuff Gong Studio in Kingston, Jamaica.  With a band called Gypsi-Fari in 1982, he recorded his first release titled "The Girls" for Obvio Records at Paul Serrano Studios in Chicago. Gypsi-Fari also won the first awards from the Chicago Music Awards in 1982.

After leaving Gypsi-Fari in 1982, Champion returned to the private sector and was recruited for a band to back Jamaican singer/songwriter Carlene Davis for her North American tour.  Her  EP release featured two songs written by Champion and was reviewed in the "College Musical Journal" (CMJ). Soon after college stations nationwide were requesting promo copies for programming.

Champion chose to form his own group and established the Roots Rock Society (RRS). With RRS, members could come and go, but the project would remain intact. With RRS, Champion created his "Tropical Roots" sound with the release of "Again", a four-song EP co-produced by David Axelbaum who worked with (Bob Seger, Peter Frampton, Johnny Winters, and Koko Taylor) that reached over 250 radio stations worldwide.

Stann Champion Radio Show
WNUR Chicago's Sound Experiment 89.3 FM
Stann Champion Show - Mondays  +7:30 a.m. to 10:00 a.m. (Central)

Discography
Gypsi-Fari - Hail Jah '45 (1981 Sonic Sounds)
Stann Champion Roots Rock Society 'Cassette (1987 RRS International)
Bass Mint Sessions 'Cassette (1991 RRS International)
Again 'Compact Disk (1994 RRS International)
Riddim to Riddim 'Compact Disk (2007 RRS International)
La Familia 'Compact Disk (2010 RRS International)
Cost of Living 'Compact Disk (2013 RRS International)
TimeBless 'Compact Disk (2015 RRS International)
Paradise Love 'Compact Disk (2016 VP Records)
See Me 'Compact Disk (2016 VP Records)

Awards and nominations

1980 "Playing for Peace Award" Kingston Jamaica 
1982 "Best Band", Gypsi- Fari  Chicago Music Awards (CMA)
1984 "Best New Band" , Safari CMA
1985 "Best Band", Safari CMA
1989 "Most Versatile Band", Roots Rock Society (RRS)
1990 RRS Received Certificate of "Special Recognition" from Lucent Technologies
1993 RRS nominated "Best Roots and Reggae", Illinois Entertainer
1994 "Best Gospel/Spiritual Entertainer", RRS CMA
1995 "Best Gospel Entertainer", RRS CMA
1996 "Best Band", RRS CMA
1997 "Most Versatile Band", RRS CMA
2002 "Producers Award" for Stann Champion CMA
2002 "Best Reggae Album/CD" for "Riddim to Riddim" CMA
2007 RRS awarded "Best Entertainer" by CMA
2008 RRS awarded "Best Entertainer" by CMA
2015 Awarded Certificate of Appreciation for Community Leadership by Chatham Avalon Park Community Council
2016 Awarded "Gresham 6 Award" for community service by 6th District
2016 Awarded "Lifetime Achievement Award" for over 35 years serving both Entertainment and communities
2019 Elixir Strings Performing Artist Program

References

External links
http://www.cinefestchicago.com/lineup (Chicago Cinefest - Bret Michaels, Blue Oyster Cult, Quite Riot, Freddy Jones Band with Roots Rock Society)
https://internationalmusician.org/stann-champion/ [International Musician Magazine 2017)
http://chicagocinema.net/?tag=stann-champion Chicago (Chicago Cinema Article)
https://chicagobroadcastingnetwork.com/video-profile-stann-champion/ (Chicago Broadcasting Network Video Profile Stann Champion)

1952 births
Living people
American male guitarists
American male singer-songwriters
Record producers from Pennsylvania
Record producers from Illinois
Columbia College Chicago alumni
American singer-songwriters